The 2010 AFC Futsal Club Championship was the 1st AFC Futsal Club Championship. It was held in Isfahan, Iran between March 4 and March 12, 2010. the event was scheduled to take place between July 4–12, 2009, but had to be postponed due to the political situation in Iran at the time.

Qualified teams

Venue

Group stage

Group A

Nawrouz suspended from the competition following the FIFA's ban of the Iraqi Football Association.

Group B

Knockout stage

Semi-finals

Third place play-off

Final

Awards 

 Most Valuable Player
 Vahid Shamsaei
 Top Scorer
 Vahid Shamsaei (17 goals)
 Fair-Play Award
 Foolad Mahan

Final standing

Top scorers

References
General
 AFC Futsal Club Championship 2010 Technical Report

Specific

External links
 Official site
 Organiser website
 Futsal planet

AFC Futsal Club Championship seasons
AFC
Club
International futsal competitions hosted by Iran